Ophichthus lentiginosus is an eel in the family Ophichthidae (worm/snake eels). It was described by John E. McCosker in 2010. It is a marine, deep water-dwelling eel which is known from Vanuatu and New Caledonia, in the western central Pacific Ocean.

The species epithet "lentiginosus" means "freckled" in Latin, and refers to the eel's colour pattern.

References

lentiginosus
Taxa named by John E. McCosker
Fish described in 2010